Mark Batterson (born November 5, 1969 in Minneapolis, Minnesota) is an American pastor and author. Batterson serves as lead pastor of National Community Church in Washington, D.C. NCC was recognized as one of the Most Innovative and Most Influential Churches in America by Outreach Magazine in 2008. Batterson is also the author of the books In a Pit with a Lion on a Snowy Day and Wild Goose Chase and blogs daily at www.evotional.com. Batterson's bestseller The Circle Maker: Praying Circles Around Your Biggest Dreams and Greatest Fears was released in December 2011.

Background
He was raised in Naperville, Illinois having been born in Minneapolis, Minnesota. Batterson first went to the University of Chicago via a scholarship to major in pre-law and playing basketball. He was called to full time ministry which led to a move to Central Bible College in Springfield, Missouri.

National Community Church
Batterson serves as lead pastor of National Community Church in Washington, D.C. One church with nine services in multiple locations, NCC is focused on reaching emerging generations. Approximately 70% of NCCers are single adults in their twenties.

The vision of NCC is to meet in movie theaters at metro stops throughout the DC area. NCC holds services at Georgetown, Kingstowne, Columbia Heights, Ballston Common Mall, and Ebenezers Coffeehouse near Union Station, all in the Washington, DC Metro Area. Ebenezers is owned and operated by NCC. In 2008, Ebenezers was recognized as the #1 coffeehouse in the metro DC area by AOL CityGuide  and has been profiled by the Washington Post  and Washington Times.

New media
Batterson and the NCC staff are known for their use of new media. Since 2005, Batterson's sermons have been available via podcast. Batterson blogs daily at www.evotional.com. In 2008, Batterson began using Twitter. Batterson's use of Twitter for ministry purposes was covered by The NewsHour with Jim Lehrer in 2009.

Books
Batterson is the author of multiple books, including "Please, Sorry, Thanks: The Three Words That Change Everything" (Multnomah; 4/3/23) “Win the Day: 7 Daily Habits to Help You Stress Less & Accomplish More”, “Whisper: How to Hear the Voice of God,” “Play the Man: Becoming the Man God Created You to Be” and “Chase the Lion: If Your Dream Doesn't Scare You, It's Too Small”. Most focus on issues of Christian living.

Social and political views

On sex
Batterson is quoted by Washington Magazine as saying "We ought to be more concerned about being biblically correct than politically correct"..."So here is the biblical bottom line: Sex outside of marriage is wrong. Sex is a sacred covenant between a husband and a wife. Period."

On homosexuality
During an interview with Washingtonian Magazine, Batterson pointed to a sermon in which he included homosexuality in a list of sexual sins.

On April 17, 2014, Batterson was a guest on "The Kojo Nnamdi Show". During the interview, Kojo Nnamdi asked Batterson "So do you believe or consider that homosexuality is a sin?" Batterson replied:

Yeah, you know, I believe that marriage is something between a husband and a wife. I think that sex is a gift from God. It was his idea. And so our church celebrates that. But it's a gift that was meant for the covenant relationship of marriage. And so that's something that we teach and encourage.

In his sermon "The Elephant in the Church: The Gray Elephant", Batterson explains

So when a church hangs a plaque endorsing homosexuality it's a gray elephant. It is approving of something God disapproves of. And while it may seem loving and accepting to some, it is approving of something God disapproves of. And that is neither loving nor honest.

Personal
Batterson has a Doctor of Ministry (D.Min.) degree from Regent University. Batterson also has two master's degrees from Trinity Evangelical Divinity School in Chicago, Illinois, and a bachelor's degree from Central Bible College in Springfield, Missouri. He is a graduate of Naperville (Illinois) Central High School.

Batterson is married to Lora and they live on Capitol Hill with their three children. Batterson is known for his love of the game cornhole and is an avid NFL and Brett Favre fan.

Books

 - probably a new edition of Id: the true you

See also 

 Religion and spirituality podcast

References

1969 births
Living people
American Christian clergy
American Christian writers
Central Bible College alumni